

Deaths 

 2 March - Josiah Mwangi Kariuki, 45, politician.

References 

1975 in Kenya